is a Japanese actor. He is well known for his role as Doc (Akira Saijō in Taiyō ni Hoero!). His ex-wife is singer Seiko Matsuda and their daughter was actress Sayaka Kanda.

Biography 
Kanda was born on December 21, 1950 in Tokyo.

He was recruited by actor Yujiro Ishihara and made his television debut in 1976 with Daitokai Tatakai no Hibi.

He married singer Seiko Matsuda in 1985, and the two had a daughter, Sayaka Kanda. The two divorced in 1997.

Selected filmography

Television
Daitokai Tatakaino Hibi (1976)
Daitokai Part II (1977) as Jin Sotaro
Oretachi wa Tenshi da! (1979) as Serizawa Jun
Taiyō ni Hoero!(1980-86) as Saijō Akira (Doc)
Onihei Hankachō (1992) episode 2
Wataru Seken wa Oni Bakari (2000,2002)
Seibu Keisatsu Special (2004) as Makoto Suzuki
Mito Kōmon (2011) Final episode
Downtown Rocket (2018)

Film
Caribe: Symphony of Love (1985)
Edo Jō Tairan (1991)

Culture Program
Asada! Namadesu Tabisarada (1997-Present) Host

References

External links
 Ishihara promotion Official Actor Masaki Kanda
Actor Masaki Kanda NHK

20th-century Japanese male actors
1950 births
Living people